In Greek mythology, Teuthras (Ancient Greek: Τεύθρας, gen. Τεύθραντος) was a king of Mysia, and mythological eponym of the town of Teuthrania.

Mythology 
Teuthras received Auge, the ill-fated mother of Telephus, and either married her or adopted her as his own daughter. Later on, Idas was attempting to dethrone Teuthras and take possession of his kingdom. Telephus, who had previously been instructed by the Delphian oracle to sail to Mysia if he wanted to find out who his mother was, arrived in time to provide aid for Teuthras and defeated Idas. He and Auge then recognized each other. Teuthras gave Telephus his daughter Argiope to wife and, since he had no male children, pronounced him successor to the kingdom of Mysia. In other versions of the myth, Auge and the young Telephus were not separated, so Teuthras received them both and raised Telephus as his own. There even existed a version that made Teuthras biological father of Telephus by Auge.

See also

 List of Trojan War characters

Notes

References 

 Apollodorus, The Library with an English Translation by Sir James George Frazer, F.B.A., F.R.S. in 2 Volumes, Cambridge, MA, Harvard University Press; London, William Heinemann Ltd. 1921. . Online version at the Perseus Digital Library. Greek text available from the same website.
Diodorus Siculus, The Library of History translated by Charles Henry Oldfather. Twelve volumes. Loeb Classical Library. Cambridge, Massachusetts: Harvard University Press; London: William Heinemann, Ltd. 1989. Vol. 3. Books 4.59–8. Online version at Bill Thayer's Web Site
 Diodorus Siculus, Bibliotheca Historica. Vol 1-2. Immanel Bekker. Ludwig Dindorf. Friedrich Vogel. in aedibus B. G. Teubneri. Leipzig. 1888-1890. Greek text available at the Perseus Digital Library.
 Gaius Julius Hyginus, Fabulae from The Myths of Hyginus translated and edited by Mary Grant. University of Kansas Publications in Humanistic Studies. Online version at the Topos Text Project.
 Stephanus of Byzantium, Stephani Byzantii Ethnicorum quae supersunt, edited by August Meineike (1790-1870), published 1849. A few entries from this important ancient handbook of place names have been translated by Brady Kiesling. Online version at the Topos Text Project.
 Strabo, The Geography of Strabo. Edition by H.L. Jones. Cambridge, Mass.: Harvard University Press; London: William Heinemann, Ltd. 1924. Online version at the Perseus Digital Library.
 Strabo, Geographica edited by A. Meineke. Leipzig: Teubner. 1877. Greek text available at the Perseus Digital Library.

Kings in Greek mythology
Mysia